The Lashly Mountains are a small group of mountains, the most prominent at  being Mount Crean, standing south of the head of Taylor Glacier and west of Lashly Glacier, in Oates Land, Antarctica. They were discovered by the British National Antarctic Expedition (1901–04) and named for William Lashly, a member of the party which explored this area.

References

Mountain ranges of Oates Land